Schistura prashadi is a species of ray-finned fish, a stone loach, in the genus Schistura. Some authorities place it in the genus Physoschistura It is known from just three localities in the Chindwin River drainage in Manipur, India. It is a benthic species of hill streams, preferring well oxygenated, clear, flowing water.

Etymology
The specific name honours Baini Prashad (1894-1969) who was an Assistant Superintendent at the Zoological Survey of India, who gave "every possible encouragement” to the describer of this species, Sunder Lal Hora.

References

Fish of Asia
Taxa named by Sunder Lal Hora
Fish described in 1921